"Bigger" is a song by New Zealand singer Stan Walker. It was released as a single through Sony Music Australia on 31 July 2020. "Bigger" peaked at number 25 on the New Zealand Singles Chart.

Music video
The music video, co-directed with Shae Sterling, is a tribute to Walker's home in Tauranga Moana, featuring sweeping scenes of Tamapahore and Mangatawa.

Track listings
Digital download/streaming
 "Bigger" – 2:56
 "Tua"  – 3:07

Digital download/streaming
 "Bigger"  – 2:56

Digital download/streaming
 "Bigger"  – 3:25

Charts

Weekly charts

Year-end charts

Certification

Release history

See also
 List of number-one Te Reo Māori singles from the 2020s

References

Stan Walker songs
2020 songs
2020 singles
Sony Music Australia singles
Songs written by Stan Walker